Borgio Verezzi is a comune (municipality) in the Province of Savona in the Italian region Liguria, located about  southwest of Genoa and about  southwest of Savona.

Geography
The municipality of Borgio Verezzi is composed by the frazioni (subdivisions, mainly villages and hamlets) Borgio and Verezzi.

Borgio's old downtown stands atop a low hill, while the modern expansions cover the coastal plain and the foothills of the Caprazoppa plateau. The main borough of Verezzi, Piazza, during summer hosts a theater festival of national relevance.

Borgio Verezzi borders the following municipalities: Finale Ligure, Pietra Ligure, and Tovo San Giacomo.

Main sights
Borgio Verezzi Caves

References

External links

  Official website
 Borgio Verezzi Caves

Cities and towns in Liguria